The 102 Squadron of the Israeli Air Force, also known as the Flying Tiger Squadron, operated A-4H Skyhawk fighters and now operates M-346 Lavi at Hatzerim Airbase in the Negev near Beersheba.

History

It was formed in August 1967 when Israel received new A-4s to replace the aging Dassault Mystere and Super Mystere. It also represented the switch to US-made weapons due to the French embargo after 1967 crisis. 
The squadron fought in all major Israeli wars since 1968, carrying out both interdiction and close ground support missions. It has suffered severe losses, the heaviest in the Yom Kippur war in 1973, when about 20 planes were lost and 7 pilots killed.

The squadron continues to fly today, playing various roles, and also uses the 2-seat M-346s in advanced IAF pilot training. The squadron is designated to continue service as operational and training units in the future.

Current role

During March 2016 the unit was noted as flying Alenia Aermacchi M-346 Lavi's.

The last A-4Ns were retired in December 2015.

References

External links

Global Security Profile
Defense Industry Daily: Israel’s Skyhawk Scandal Leads to End of an Era (Archived 2009-08-17)

Israeli Air Force squadrons
Flying training squadrons
Military units and formations established in 1967